Uncinula is a genus of fungi. Its species are plant pathogens that cause powdery mildew diseases on various plant hosts. The genus is characterized by its dark chasmothecia which bear filamentous, hyaline appendages with hooked tips. Over one hundred species have been described from mostly dicotyledenous hosts. Braun and Takamatsu (2000) suggested that Uncinula should be considered a later synonym of Erysiphe; not all subsequent researchers have accepted their conclusions.

One notorious species, Uncinula necator (syn. Erysiphe necator), attacks various species of grapes (Vitis spp.) and can cause yield losses in European wine grapes. Other Uncinula species attack a wide variety of dicotyledonous plants.

References 

 Braun U, Takamatsu S. 2000. Phylogeny of Erysiphe, Microsphaera, Uncinula (Erysipheae) and Cystotheca, Podosphaera, Sphaerotheca (Cystotheceae) inferred from rDNA ITS sequences: Some taxonomic consequences. Schlechtendalia 4: 1-33.

External links 
 Index Fungorum
 USDA ARS Fungal Database

Erysiphales
Fungal plant pathogens and diseases
Taxa named by Joseph-Henri Léveillé